Faisal Farooqui is an Indian technology entrepreneur and the founder and CEO of the review and rating platform MouthShut.com.

In 2002, he founded Zarca Interactive (The parent company of SoGoSurvey and K12Insight), a Virginia-based enterprise survey and feedback company. He is the seed investor in DeHaat, an agri-tech company.

Early life 
Faisal Farooqui was born in Mumbai, Maharashtra. His father owned bakeries in the city. He attended St. Stanislaus High School in Bandra, Mumbai. He received a Bachelor of Science in Information Systems and Finance from State University of New York at Binghamton.

Faisal was elected to the University's Faculty Senate Committee and the Student government. He became the technology editor of the campus newspaper, Pipe Dream.

Career 
After finishing his undergraduate studies, he started working at American Management Systems as a telecommunication consultant. He moved to India in 2000 and established MouthShut.com as a platform for reviews of products and services. MouthShut popularized the concept of advertising on rickshaws for marketing purposes.

In 2001 Faisal started the dial-the-CEO program on MouthShut where consumers could directly call the CEO. The program was later adopted by many businesses for interaction between CEOs and customers directly.

In 2011, he beta-launched Dealface.com which connects consumers with local businesses. This was the first website that provided SMS-based coupons. Later Dealface was integrated with MouthShut.

He was also the official spokesperson to Indian actor Dilip Kumar. His family has a long-standing relationship with Kumar. During the last days of actor Faisal released all his health updates to the media. He received a 2006 Manthan Award for Best Youth website. In several interviews in 2015, he stated that he supports net neutrality. In a 2017 interview, Farooqui stated his preference for shifting India's time zone by 30 minutes.

Farooqui's biographical memoir of Dilip Kumar titled In The Shadow of a Legend: Dilip Kumar was launched on 7 July 2022, the first death anniversary of Dilip Kumar.

Auto Rickshaw Advertising 
Faisal is credited with introducing the concept of using auto-rickshaws (also known as rickshaws or tuk-tuk) as a medium for advertising and mass media. He used the back of the hoods of autorickshaws to advertise his startup Mouthshut.com in 2001.

Freedom of expression 
As an advocate of Freedom of expression on the Internet, Faisal filed a writ petition in the Supreme Court for challenging the Information Technology Rules, 2011. The Supreme Court in its verdict directed striking down the Section 66A and reading down of many other sections of the Information Technology Act of India terming it was unconstitutional.

Board membership 

 Board of Governors, Software Freedom Law Center (SFLC)
 Committee, Ghalib Institute, Delhi
 Convenor, MoreSunlight
 Founding Member, Lead Angels Investment

Publications

Books

Research papers 

 Application of market research towards proactive customer relationship management

Controversies 
Pune-based Kumar builders sent a legal notice to Faisal and MouthShut.com and demanded Rs.2000 crore damages for fake reviews appearing on MouthShut.com about them.

Institute of Management and Technical Studies sent a legal notice to Faisal for fake review post on his website MouthShut about the institute. It alleged that the reviews were intended to bring the institute's reliability down.

IT Act/Section 66A 
Faisal was among the lead petitioners who challenged the sections of IT Act section 66 A through a petition in the Supreme Court of India in 2013. In 2015, the court struck down 66A, holding it unconstitutional and diluting many other sections.

Faisal's firm MouthShut has received 790 takedown notices, 240 legal notices, and 11 court cases against it. Hence, Farooqui and Mouthshut.com decided to challenge these notices by petitioning the Supreme Court of India to read down the Intermediary Guidelines Rules 2011.

In 2014, Beam Fiber, an ISP in Hyderabad and Bangalore blocked access to Mouthshut.com. Farooqui challenged this illegal block and Beam Fiber later unblocked its access with an apology.

Awards and honours 

 Named as one of the 50 Indian's in list of Young Leaders by British High Commission

References 

Living people
Indian activists
People from Maharashtra
Year of birth missing (living people)